Jennifer Tucker is Associate Professor of History and Science in Society at Wesleyan University. She is a member of the Connecticut Academy of Arts and Sciences.

Works 
Nature Exposed: Photography as Eyewitness in Victorian Science (2013) 
Tucker, Jennifer. "Opinion: The Medieval Roots of Todd Akin's Theories". The New York Times. August 24, 2012.

External links 
Official website
Wesleyan website

Year of birth missing (living people)
Living people
Wesleyan University faculty
Place of birth missing (living people)